"Blessings" is a song by American rapper Big Sean from his third studio album Dark Sky Paradise (2015). The song was serviced to urban contemporary radio on January 31, 2015, as the album's third official single. It features Canadian rapper Drake and GOOD Music label boss Kanye West, with production from Vinylz and Allen Ritter. The music video for the song was released on YouTube on March 3, 2015. The single and music video version feature Drake and West, while the album version featured only Drake. The song received two nominations at the 2015 Soul Train Music Awards for Best Collaboration and Hip-Hop Song of the Year

Background
The video of the song was released in greyscale. The original release only contained a feature from Drake, this being the version which appears on Dark Sky Paradise. An extended version featuring an additional verse from Kanye West was released as a single on February 3, 2015. Big Sean makes a reference to the Cartoon Network series Ed, Edd N Eddy in the song when he raps “I’ve lost homies who been with me since Ed, Edd N Eddy”.

Charts

Year-end charts

Certifications

References 

2014 songs
2015 singles
Big Sean songs
Drake (musician) songs
Kanye West songs
Black-and-white music videos
Song recordings produced by Vinylz
Songs written by Big Sean
Songs written by Drake (musician)
Songs written by Kanye West
Songs written by Vinylz
Songs written by Allen Ritter
Song recordings produced by Allen Ritter